Jan Owen  (born 17 October 1959) is an Australian non-government sector leader, social entrepreneur, and author of Every Childhood Lasts a Lifetime (1996) and The Future Chasers (2014).

Career 

Owen was President of the Youth Affairs Council of Australia from 1984 to 1986, which included International Youth Year, held in 1985. In 1994, Owen founded the Create Foundation, which is directed to improving the lives of children and young people living in care. She was the inaugural CEO from 1994 to 2001. In 2002, Owen was appointed Executive Director of Social Ventures Australia, which was established to bring venture capital models to the non -government sector in Australia. Owen convened the second Social Enterprise World Forum, held in Melbourne 2009.

From September 2010 to December 2019, Owen was CEO of the Foundation for Young Australians (FYA).  During her tenure, FYA launched the New Work Order research series, encompassing seven reports analyzing the impact of digitization, the Fourth Industrial Revolution, and the emergence of gig workers and the Precariat on employment pathways for young Australians. During this time, FYA also convened the Safe Schools Coalition Australia, directed to supporting school staff to create more inclusive school environments for same-sex-attracted, intersex and gender-diverse students, school staff and families.

In 2020, Owen was appointed Co-Chair of Learning Creates Australia, which is focused on reforming accreditation systems in the Australian education system. In the same year, she also co-founded AdaptabilityQ, a boutique strategic advisory service for non-government organisations.

Owen holds several honorary appointments, including Patron, Good Design Australia, and Ambassador, Children's Ground, which works with Aboriginal children.

Awards and honours

Owen was named one of Australian Financial Review’s True Leaders in 2018 and its inaugural Overall Woman of Influence in 2012. She has been awarded honorary Doctorates from the University of Sydney in 2014 and Murdoch University in 2018. Owen was awarded membership to the Order of Australia in 2000 for service to the welfare of children and youth.

References 

1959 births
Living people
Members of the Order of Australia
Australian women writers
Australian non-fiction writers
Writers from Melbourne
Social entrepreneurs